Cervantes is a municipality in the comarca of Os Ancares, in the province of Lugo, Galicia, Spain.

It had a population of 1,973 in 2005, and has an area of 277 square kilometres. Its highest point is Mustellar (1924 m), in the Ancares mountains.

Until the second half of the 20th century this part of Spain was isolated. Many settlements had no road access or electricity and were cut off by snow in winter. Communities were small and self-sufficient. This way of life is shown in the small museum at Piornedo which is located in a preserved palloza.

The main economic activities in 2006 were agriculture, forestry and tourism.

Geography
Cervantes is located in the natural mountainous setting of Ancares in Lugo. In the vicinity are located the following peaks:
 Mustallar (1,924 m)
 Miravalles (1,969 m)
 Tres Bispos (1,793 m)
 Pena Rubia (1,826 m)
 Pena Larga, Lagosd
 Charcos (passes 1,800 metros)
 Formigueiros (1,643 m)
 Piapaxaro (1,616 m)
 Tesón (1,374 m)
 Pena (1,118 m)
 Lago (1,085 m)
 Pena Ouviaña (893 m)
 Pico Murado (1,111 m)
 Pico Cuiña (1,998m)

These elevations are located in the nearby mountain ranges of A Trappe, Lóuzara, O Oribio, O Rañadoiro and O Piornal .

The municipalities of the eastern mountains of Lugo make up the Galician region of Navia. The municipalities of Negueira de Muñiz, Navia, Cervantes and As Nogais are fully Naviano municipalities.

Flora and vegetation
The lands in Cervantes in the eastern mountains are home to a rich flora. Of the total species that exist in Galician, which is around 2,200 species and subspecies, only in the nearby highlands of O Courel can 800 taxa, nearly 40% of the total, in an area that represents 1% of the Galician surface, be found. The catalog of Os Ancares, that includes two slopes, consists of 1,028 vascular plant species and subspecies. There are 33 fern species that are located in these mountains as class 7 of pteridology wealth, out of a maximum of 8. This is one of the areas of greatest diversity of ferns in Spain.

The relatively good state of conservation of the area means that there remains a forested area with a good presence of trees: oak, Mountain Oak, Turkey oak, beech, yew, elm mountain, hazel, holly, maple, birch, chestnut, cherry, rowan, ash, alder, willows and poplars.

In Galicia only the high peaks of Os Trevinca and Ancares and are above the forest limit, each with its corresponding shrub.

Fauna
Of the 75 species of reptiles and amphibians living in the peninsula of Spain and on the islands, 27 are present in Os Ancares. They are triturus (3 species), frog (6 species), lizards (Lacerta), vipers and snakes (6 species). Among birds, passerines are important for good representation, followed by accipitrines, among which are the short-toed eagle, the goshawk, abundant hawks, buzzards and the hen harrier. There is no shortage of red and gray partridge or grouse.

History
According to some historians, this land was the probable origin of the lineage of Miguel de Cervantes, since as the last name of Saavedra appears in the baptismal records of the parish of Vilarello Igrexa which gives birth before to the principal author of Spanish literature. Cervantes scholars consider this as hare-brained; Cervantes did not even use the 2nd surname Saavedra (not his birth name) until he was in his 20s.

At the beginning of Chapter XXXIX of the Part 1 of Don Quixote, a secondary character, the captive companion of Zoraida, says she is from "Somewhere in the mountains of León". "[That] was my first lineage, with whom the nature of fortune was most grateful and liberal, although in the narrowness of those towns still reached the riches of my father's reputation...''"

External links
Official site (in Spanish)

Municipalities in the Province of Lugo